

The BJ-520 or "Bullet" was a two-seat sports airplane designed in the United States for amateur construction.

Development
Dr. Bergon Brokaw, having flown fighter aircraft in the United States Navy in the 1940s and 1950s, set out to create an aircraft with fighter-like performance and a rear seat to carry his wife "Buddy".  With the help of Ernie Jones, they created a low-wing single-engine high-speed aircraft which was also stressed for aerobatic flight.  After six years of development and construction, it first flew in October 1972  and was considered the fastest homebuilt aircraft extant.  Its tricycle undercarriage is retractable.

The name and the aircraft's registration number (N520BJ) came from the first letters of Brokaw and Jones and the  displacement of the engine.

It is displayed with that engine at the Sun 'n Fun Museum as of 2008.

During the 1970s and 1980s, Brokaw marketed the plans to other homebuilders.

The prototype aircraft is preserved and displayed at the Sun 'n Fun air museum at Lakeland, Florida.

Only one plans-built Brokaw Bullet has been completed by builder Gene Underland. There are a few projects still in the process of being completed, but builder support is dubious since Brokaw died on 27 August 2004.

Specifications (original BJ-520)

References

 
 
 Sun 'n Fun Air Museum website 

1970s United States sport aircraft
Homebuilt aircraft
Bullet
Single-engined tractor aircraft
Low-wing aircraft
Single-engined turboprop aircraft
Aircraft first flown in 1972